Museum Hours is a 2012 Austrian-American drama film written and directed by Jem Cohen. The film is set in and around Vienna's Kunsthistorisches Museum.

Plot
When a Vienna museum guard befriends an enigmatic visitor, the grand Kunsthistorisches Museum becomes a crossroads that sparks explorations of their lives, the city, and the ways art reflects and shapes the world.

One Vienna winter, Johan, a guard at the grand Kunsthistorisches Museum encounters Anne, a visitor called to Austria for a family medical emergency. Never having been to Austria and with little money, she wanders the city in limbo, taking the museum as her refuge. Johann, initially wary, offers help, and they're drawn into each other's worlds. Their meeting sparks an unexpected series of explorations – of their own lives and the life of the city, and of the way artwork can reflect and shape daily experience. The museum is seen not as an archaic institution of historical artifacts, but as an enigmatic crossroads in which, through the art, a discussion takes place across time with vital implications in the contemporary world. The "conversations" embodied in the museum's collection revolve around the matters that most concern us: death, sex, history, theology, materialism, and so on. It's through the regular lives of the guard and displaced visitor that these heady subjects are brought down to earth and made manifest.

Near the film's end, Johann and Anne are exploring on the fringe of the city when her ill cousin's condition reaches a crisis point.

Cast
 Mary Margaret O'Hara as Anne
 Bobby Sommer as Johann
 Ela Piplits as Gerda Pachner

Release
Museum Hours premiered at the 2012 Locarno International Film Festival, had its North American premiere within the 2012 Toronto International Film Festival, and screened within such U.S. film festivals as South by Southwest and Maryland Film Festival.

The film was acquired for U.S. distribution by The Cinema Guild.

Awards and nominations

Film

References

External links
 
 
 
 
 

2012 films
2012 drama films
Austrian drama films
American drama films
2010s German-language films
Films set in Vienna
Films shot in Vienna
Austrian independent films
American independent films
2012 independent films
Films set in museums
2010s English-language films
2010s American films